Berlin-Spandau – Charlottenburg North is an electoral constituency (German: Wahlkreis) represented in the Bundestag. It elects one member via first-past-the-post voting. Under the current constituency numbering system, it is designated as constituency 78. It is located in western Berlin, comprising the Spandau borough.

Berlin-Spandau – Charlottenburg North was created for the inaugural 1990 federal election after German reunification. Since 2021, it has been represented by Helmut Kleebank of the Social Democratic Party (SPD).

Geography
Berlin-Spandau – Charlottenburg North is located in western Berlin. As of the 2021 federal election, it comprises the entirety of the Spandau borough as well as small parts of Charlottenburg-Wilmersdorf, specifically the locality of Charlottenburg-Nord and the neighbourhood of Kalowswerder from Charlottenburg locality.

History
Berlin-Spandau – Charlottenburg North was created after German reunification in 1990, then known as Berlin-Spandau. It acquired its current name in the 2002 election. In the 1990 election, it was constituency 251 in the numbering system. In the 1994 and 1998 elections, it was number 252. In the 2002 through 2009 elections, it was number 79. Since the 2013 election, it has been number 78. Originally, the constituency was coterminous with the borough of Spandau. In the 2002 election, it gained the area of Charlottenburg-Wilmersdorf north of the Spree.

Members
The constituency was first represented by Peter Kittelmann of the Christian Democratic Union (CDU) from 1990 to 1994, followed by Heinrich Lummer from 1994 to 1998. It was won by the Social Democratic Party (SPD) in 1998 and represented by Wolfgang Behrendt until 2002, followed by Swen Schulz until 2009. Kai Wegner of the CDU was elected in 2009 and re-elected in 2013. Former member Schulz regained the constituency in the 2017 election. He was succeeded by Helmut Kleebank in 2021.

Election results

2021 election

2017 election

2013 election

2009 election

References

Federal electoral districts in Berlin
Spandau
Charlottenburg-Wilmersdorf
Constituencies established in 1990
1990 establishments in Germany